Ruhle Road Lenticular Metal Truss Bridge is a historic Lenticular truss bridge located in Malta, Saratoga County, New York. It was constructed in 1888 by the Berlin Iron Bridge Company of East Berlin, Connecticut, and originally spanned the Black Creek in Salem, Washington County, New York.

It was moved to its present location in 2001 and spans the Ballston Creek, where it is used by pedestrians and non-motorized vehicles.  It replaced the Ruhle Road Stone Arch Bridge that collapsed in 1993 and subsequently delisted from the National Register of Historic Places.  It is a single span with an overall length of 57 feet, 7 inches and width of 14 feet. It was listed on the National Register of Historic Places in 2004.

References

Bridges in Saratoga County, New York
Lenticular truss bridges in the United States
Bridges completed in 1888
Road bridges on the National Register of Historic Places in New York (state)
Former road bridges in the United States
Pedestrian bridges in New York (state)
Relocated buildings and structures in New York (state)
National Register of Historic Places in Saratoga County, New York
Metal bridges in the United States
1888 establishments in New York (state)